Virginia's 11th House of Delegates district elects one of the 100 members of the Virginia House of Delegates. Located in southwestern Virginia, District 11 includes part of the city of Roanoke. District 11 is represented by Democrat Sam Rasoul.

Electoral history

2013 
The seat has been held by Democrat Sam Rasoul since 2013. The previous incumbent Onzlee Ware resigned in late 2012 to spend time with an ailing family member, prompting a special election in January 2013. Rasoul won the low-turnout contest, in which just 14% of eligible voters participated. Rasoul earned 70% of the vote, defeating Roanoke’s Republican sheriff  Octavia Johnson.

District officeholders

References

011
Roanoke, Virginia